Domeño is a municipality in the comarca of Los Serranos in the Valencian Community, Spain. The name in Valencian is Domenyo, but the local language is Spanish, not Valencian.

See also
Sierra de Utiel

References

Municipalities in the Province of Valencia
Los Serranos